The third season of Indian television show Satyamev Jayate premiered on Star Plus. The title of third season is tagged with Mumkin Hai (It is possible). It was scheduled to be launched on 21 September 2014, but later its start date postponed to 5 October 2014. Unlike its first and second season, Satyamev Jayate (TV series) (Season 3) had longer episodes and celebrity interactions. The trailers, presented in the show's documentary style, featured real interviews with people who have been affected by the show, on a deeper, personal level.

Promo
The promotional video of Satyamev Jayate (Season 3) showed how a bus conductor deals with a pervert traveling in the bus, staring at a girl. In order to protect the girl, the bus conductor asks him to buy a ticket and informs him about the start of its new season.

Episodes

References

External links
 Official site
 Official YouTube

2014 Indian television seasons
Satyamev Jayate (talk show)
StarPlus original programming